The Wolseley Viper is a British-built, high-compression derivative of the Hispano Suiza HS-8 liquid-cooled V-8 engine, built under licence by Wolseley Motors during World War I.

It powered later models of the S.E.5a, SPAD VII and other British or British-built aircraft designed for the Hispano-Suiza.

Variants

 Wolseley W.4A Python I
 Wolseley W.4A Python II
 Wolseley W.4A Viper
 Wolseley W.4B Adder I
 Wolseley W.4B Adder II
 Wolseley W.4B Adder III
 Wolseley W.4A Python

Applications
Airco DH.9
Avro 552
Bristol M.R.1
Bristol Tourer
Cierva C.8
Martinsyde F.6
Royal Aircraft Factory S.E.5a
Sopwith Antelope
Sopwith Cuckoo

Survivors
A Wolseley Viper powered Royal Aircraft Factory S.E.5a is owned by, and on display at The Shuttleworth Collection, Old Warden Aerodrome in the UK.

Engines on display
A preserved Wolseley Viper is on public display at the Science Museum, London.
A preserved Wolseley Viper is on public display at the Museo Nacional de Aeronáutica de Argentina

Specifications (W.4A Viper)

See also

References

Notes

Bibliography

 Lumsden, Alec. British Piston Engines and their Aircraft. Marlborough, Wiltshire: Airlife Publishing, 2003. .

Viper
1910s aircraft piston engines